The Rhymney River is a river in the Rhymney Valley, South Wales, flowing through Cardiff into the Severn Estuary. The river formed the boundary between the historic counties of Glamorgan and Monmouthshire until in 1887, the parishes east of the river, Rumney and St Mellons, were transferred from the jurisdiction of Newport, to Cardiff in Glamorgan.

The river flows south from its source near Rhymney through New Tredegar, Bargoed, Ystrad Mynach, Llanbradach to  Caerphilly at the southern end of the Rhymney Valley. Then past Bedwas, Trethomas, Machen, Draethen, Llanrumney and Rumney and its estuary into the River Severn.

The Rhymney Valley was created as a glacial valley. Sourced within the valley, on the southern edge of the Brecon Beacons, the Rhymney River descends steeply through the town of New Tredegar towards Ystrad Mynach, and then onwards south across a flat plain before entering the Severn Estuary to the east of Cardiff. The villages of Groesfaen, Deri, Pentwyn and Fochriw are located in the Darran Valley and not the Rhymney Valley, which joins the Rhymney Valley at Bargoed.

 The upper reaches: steep-sided, wet, mountainous upper valley
 The lower reaches: flatter wider valley below Machen, where the river assumes a lowland meandering character

Being located in part of the South Wales coalfield and South Wales Valleys iron producing area, the resultant black river had poor water quality through most of the 19th and 20th centuries. The river is culverted in many of its upper sections, including a tunnel under the former factory complexes in Rhymney, exiting at Pontlottyn. Since the closure of the last of the coal mines in the late 1980s, the water has become a lot cleaner and is now full of fish and insect life and supports plenty of other wildlife. The river now supports a healthy stock of grayling and natural brown trout, and a lot of work has been undertaken to remove former industrial restrictions on the river to allow the fish to gain access to its upper reaches. The river is in the care of Natural Resources Wales and the South East Wales Rivers Trust.

References

External links
Rhymney River Club - Marina

Tributaries of the River Severn
Rivers of the Brecon Beacons National Park
Rivers of Caerphilly County Borough
Rivers of Cardiff
Rivers of Newport, Wales
Rivers of Powys
Fishing in Wales
1Rhymney